Partial general elections were held in Belgium on 8 June 1847. The result was a victory for the new Liberal Association, which had been formed the previous year. It won 33 seats to the Catholics' 21, as the latter were split into dogmatic and liberal groups. Only 1% of the country's population was eligible to vote.

Under the alternating system, Chamber elections were only held in four out of the nine provinces: East Flanders, Hainaut, Liège and Limburg. Thus, 54 of the 108 Chamber seats were up for election. The total number of Chamber seats increased from 98 to 108 following a reapportionment due to population increases.

While the liberals gained a majority in the Chamber, the Catholics retained theirs in the Senate. Following the election, the Catholic government led by Barthélémy de Theux de Meylandt resigned. After a political crisis of two months, a liberal government was formed on 12 August 1847, headed by Charles Rogier. The liberals would go on to win the 1848 elections.

Results

Chamber of Representatives

Senate

References

Belgium
1840s elections in Belgium
General
Belgium